Hauntings at Cliffhouse is a 2012 point-and-click adventure game. It was a solo project of Cindy Pondillo; the independent developer's third adventure.

Plot and gameplay 
Sarah Blake travels to the Cliffhouse Bed and Breakfast resort to withdraw after the death of her husband.

Critical reception 
Katie Smith of Adventure Gamers praised the artwork although deemed the characters forgettable. Avsn-Nikki of Adventurespiele wrote that Pondillo crafted a story that slowly and successfully builds in suspense.

References 

Windows games
2012 video games